Bucculatrix regaella is a moth in the family Bucculatricidae. It is found in Algeria. The species was described in 1907 by Pierre Chrétien.

The larvae feed on Helianthemum sessiliflorum.

References

Bucculatricidae
Moths described in 1907
Moths of Africa